The Tornado outbreak sequence of May 2004 produced several tornado outbreaks between May 21 and May 31, 2004, across mostly the Midwestern and Southern United States as well as southern Ontario, including three major outbreaks on May 22, May 24 and May 29–30. Overall, the sequence produced 389 tornadoes, which makes it one of the most productive tornado outbreak sequences in history.

The Hallam, Nebraska tornado outbreak on May 22 produced nearly 60 tornadoes across mostly Nebraska and Iowa including an F4 that tore through the town Hallam situated halfway between Lincoln and Beatrice. However, in May 2013 it was passed by the El Reno, Oklahoma tornado with a width of 2.6 miles wide. On May 24, another tornado outbreak took place across the central United States, with about 50 tornadoes confirmed in Kansas, Illinois, Nebraska and Missouri. One person was killed in western Illinois near Winchester west of Springfield. A smaller outbreak on May 27 produced a damaging tornado in the city of Lexington in northern Kentucky.

The Memorial Day Weekend outbreak produced one of the largest tornado outbreaks on record from May 29, 2004 to the early morning hours of May 31, 2004. During the Memorial Day Weekend, 168 tornadoes touched down from the Midwestern United States from the Dakotas to Oklahoma eastward towards the Ohio and Tennessee Valleys from Ohio and Indiana southward towards Alabama. This outbreak has been compared with the April 3–4, 1974 Super Outbreak in terms of number of tornadoes, but had much fewer strong to violent tornadoes, with only one violent tornado in Missouri and 16 other strong tornadoes, while there were 30 violent and 66 strong tornadoes during the record-breaking event in 1974. At least five people were killed by this outbreak across two states, including four in Missouri and one in Indiana, but the death toll is much lower than the 315 or more deaths recorded during the 1974 event.

Confirmed tornadoes

May 21 event

May 22 event

May 23 event

May 24 event

May 25 event

May 26 event

May 27 event

May 28 event

May 29 event

May 30 event

May 31 event

See also
 List of North American tornadoes and tornado outbreaks
 Tornadoes of 2004

External links 
Hallam Nebraska Tornado (NWS Omaha, Nebraska)
Summary of the Storms of May 22nd and 24th, 2004 (NWS Hastings, Nebraska)
May 29, 2004: Tornadoes across Northwest Missouri (NWS Kansas City, Missouri)
May 30, 2004 Tornado Outbreak (NWS Indianapolis, Indiana)
F3 tornado strikes Peru, Indiana (NWS Northern Indiana)
Severe Weather Outbreak of May 30, 2004 (NWS Central Illinois)
30 May 2004 Event (NWS St. Louis)
Jefferson County, Kentucky Tornado Damage (NWS Louisville, Kentucky)
Floyd County, Indiana Tornado Damage (NWS Louisville, Kentucky)
Crawford County, Indiana (Marengo) Tornado Damage (NWS Louisville, Kentucky)
Clark County, Indiana Tornado Damage (NWS Louisville, Kentucky)
Tornadoes in the Paducah county warning area (NWS Paducah, Kentucky)

F4 tornadoes by date
Tornadoes of 2004
Tornadoes in Kansas
Tornadoes in Kentucky
Tornadoes in Indiana
Tornadoes in Illinois
Tornadoes in Iowa
Tornadoes in Missouri
Tornadoes in Nebraska
Tornadoes in Oklahoma
Tornado outbreak sequence
Tornadoes in Ontario
2004-05-22